Aeron Clement (Swansea, 1936–1989) was a Welsh science fiction author. He is most known for having written The Cold Moons, a Watership Down-style story about badgers.

Books
 The Cold Moons (1987)

References

External links

1936 births
1989 deaths
20th-century American novelists
American male novelists
American science fiction writers
20th-century American male writers